Fashion Victims is a 2007 German comedy film directed by .

Cast 
 Edgar Selge - Wolfgang Zenker
  - Karsten Zenker
  - Steven Brookmüller
 Franziska Walser - Erika Zenker
 Traute Hoess - Brigitta
  - Polizist Gerhardt 
  - Juniorchef
 Horst Krause - Horst / Reinigungsangestellte
 Lara Beckmann - Lucie
 Janna Wangenbach - Nicola
 Susanne Rasper - Frau Franzen
  - Herr Schiller
 Jessica Schwarz - Frau Pfeiffer
 Irm Hermann - Frau Retzlaff

References

External links 

2007 comedy films
2007 films
German comedy films
2000s German films
German LGBT-related films
2007 LGBT-related films